Gymnothorax walvisensis is an eel in the family Muraenidae (moray eels). It was described by Artem Mikhailovich Prokofiev in 2009. It is a subtropical, marine eel which is known from Walvis Ridge, in the southeastern Atlantic Ocean (from which its species epithet is derived). Males are known to reach a maximum total length of 41.3 cm.

References

walvisensis
Taxa named by Artem Mikhailovich Prokofiev
Fish described in 2009